Heliorabdia is a genus of moth in the subfamily Arctiinae. It contains only one species, Heliorabdia taiwana, which is found in Taiwan.

References

External links
Natural History Museum Lepidoptera generic names catalog

Lithosiini
Monotypic moth genera
Moths of Asia